"Falling to Pieces" is the third single on Faith No More's first studio album with Mike Patton on vocals, The Real Thing. The song was released as a single on July 2, 1990. The song peaked at number 92 on the Billboard Hot 100 and number 40 on the Billboard Album Rock Tracks chart. The song has rarely been performed live due to the band's disdain for it.

Live performances
Despite its success, the song did not go on to be a live staple, appearing very rarely in concerts after their appearance at the 1993 Phoenix Festival, where Billy Gould announced, "This is the last time we'll ever play this song again" right before the song. During Second Coming Tour, the band picked up the song again and performed it at least once at a concert in Rio de Janeiro in 2009. The song was performed at the Open'er Festival in 2014 for the first time since 2009. In a 2016 interview, Gould stated, "That song sucks, let's face it. I don't know, we don't groove on that one. Also, when you play it live, it just kind of gets boring".

Music video

The bass-driven song spawned a video directed by Ralph Ziman (who also directed the video for "Epic"), in which lead singer Mike Patton wears a series of different outfits, including one resembling Alex from the Stanley Kubrick film A Clockwork Orange. Billy Gould wears various death metal band shirts during the video including Carcass and, at the time, Sepultura. The video is also notable for using a different mix of the song featuring more prominent background vocals, keyboards, and a guitar solo during the fade out.

There is also another lesser known music video  which uses clips from the Brixton Academy performance, played with the album version of the song.

Track listings
Disc one
 "Falling to Pieces" – 3:39
 "We Care a Lot" (live at Brixton) – 3:59
 "Underwater Love" (live at Brixton) – 3:32
 "From Out of Nowhere" (live at Brixton) – 3:47

Disc two
 "Falling to Pieces" (re-mix)
 "Zombie Eaters"
 "The Real Thing" (live) 
 "The Real Thing" was recorded live at the Wireless on July 30, 1990 also, features ad-lib from Public Enemy's "911 Is a Joke".

The Brixton Academy live tracks are different mixes to those found on the LP of the concert, most notably including the line "About the smack and crack and whack that hits the streets" on "We Care a Lot", which is mostly muted on the LP mix.

Charts

References

Faith No More songs
1990 singles
Songs written by Billy Gould
Songs written by Roddy Bottum
Songs written by Mike Patton
Songs written by Jim Martin (musician)
1989 songs
Slash Records singles